Lam Takhong is a watercourse in Thailand and a tributary of the Mun River in northeastern Thailand. It is impounded by the Lam Takhong Dam.

References

Takhong